Sphingonaepiopsis asiatica, the Kopet hawkmoth, is a moth of the family Sphingidae. The species was first described by Tomáš Melichar and Michal Řezáč in 2013. It is found in the Kopet-Dagh Mountains, along the border of northern Iran and southern Turkmenistan.

The wingspan is about 34 mm. The forewings are grey brown, with a kidney-shaped dark brown patch at the base. The hindwings are light yellow with grey. Adults have been recorded on wing from mid-April to early June.

References

Sphingonaepiopsis
Moths described in 2013